Joseph "Jay" Born Kadane (born January 10, 1941) is the Leonard J. Savage University Professor of Statistics, Emeritus in the Department of Statistics and Social and Decision Sciences at Carnegie Mellon University. Kadane is one of the early proponents of Bayesian statistics, particularly the subjective Bayesian philosophy.

Education and career 
Kadane was born in Washington, DC and raised in Freeport on Long Island, Kadane, prepared at Phillips Exeter Academy, earned an A.B. in mathematics from Harvard College and a Ph.D. in statistics from Stanford in 1966, under the supervision of Professor Herman Chernoff. While in graduate school, Kadane worked for the Center for Naval Analyses (CNA). Upon finishing, he accepted a joint appointment at the Yale statistics department and the Cowles Foundation. In 1968, he left Yale and served as an analyst at CNA for three years. In 1971, he moved to Pittsburgh to join Morris H. DeGroot at Carnegie Mellon University. He became the second tenured professor in the Department of Statistics. Kadane served as department head from 1972-1981 and steered the department to a balance between theoretical and applied work, advocating that statisticians should engage in joint research in substantive areas rather than acting as consultants.

Research 
Kadane's contributions span a wide range of fields: econometrics, law, medicine, political science, sociology, computer science (see maximum subarray problem), archaeology, and environmental science, among others. He has been elected as a Fellow of the American Academy of Arts and Sciences, a fellow of the American Association for the Advancement of Science, a fellow of the American Statistical Association, and a fellow of the Institute of Mathematical Statistics.  Kadane authored over 250 peer-reviewed publications and has served the statistical community in many capacities, including as editor of the Journal of the American Statistical Association from 1983-85.

References

External links
http://www.stat.cmu.edu/people/faculty/jay-kadane
http://www.stat.cmu.edu/~kadane

1941 births
Living people
American statisticians
Bayesian statisticians
Harvard College alumni
Carnegie Mellon University faculty
Fellows of the American Statistical Association
Stanford University alumni
Fellows of the American Academy of Arts and Sciences
Phillips Exeter Academy alumni
People from Freeport, New York
Mathematical statisticians
Yale University faculty